Lasse Norman Hansen (born 11 February 1992) is a Danish professional road and track racing cyclist, who currently rides for UCI ProTeam . During his track cycling career, he has won five medals (including two golds) at the Summer Olympic Games, ten medals (including three golds) at the UCI Track Cycling World Championships and six medals (including two golds) at the UEC European Track Championships.

Biography
He won the gold medal in the men's omnium at the 2012 Summer Olympics. After two seasons with Blue Water Cycling, He signed with the  squad for the 2014 and 2015 seasons. He was named in the startlist for the 2017 Vuelta a España. After the collapse of the  team, in September 2018 he revealed that he would join the  team on a two-year deal from the start of 2019, in part because they were willing to give him the freedom to compete on the track in the 2020 Summer Olympics in Tokyo.

In August 2021, he won the gold medal in the Madison track cycling at the Tokyo 2020 Olympic Games in partnership with Michael Mørkøv.

Personal life
He was born in Faaborg, Denmark and currently resides in Girona, Catalonia, Spain. He is the brother of racing cyclist Louise Norman Hansen.

Major results

Road

2009
 National Junior Championships
1st  Road race
1st  Time trial
 3rd  Time trial, UCI Junior World Championships
 8th Overall Trofeo Karlsberg
2010
 1st  Time trial, National Junior Championships
2011
 National Under-23 Championships
1st  Road race
3rd Time trial
 1st Stage 2 Coupe des nations Ville Saguenay
2012
 1st Stage 7 Rás Tailteann
 4th Time trial, UCI World Under-23 Championships
 10th Time trial, UEC European Under-23 Road Championships
2013
 National Under-23 Championships
1st  Road race
1st  Time trial
 1st GP Herning
 1st Eschborn-Frankfurt City Loop U23
 2nd Overall Thüringen Rundfahrt der U23
 3rd  Time trial, UCI World Under-23 Championships
 3rd Overall Tour de Berlin
1st Stage 2 (ITT)
 5th Time trial, National Championships
 8th Chrono Champenois
2014
 3rd Overall Dubai Tour
2015
 6th Overall Tour of Alberta
1st Stage 5
 9th Velothon Berlin
2016
 3rd Road race, National Championships
2017
 1st  Mountains classification, Tour de Suisse
 3rd Dwars door West-Vlaanderen
2018
 1st Stage 1 Herald Sun Tour
 3rd Overall Danmark Rundt
1st Stage 1
 3rd Grote Prijs Stad Zottegem
 8th Ronde van Limburg
2019
 3rd Ronde van Limburg
 4th Overall Danmark Rundt
1st Stage 3
2022
 7th Grand Prix Megasaray
 7th Grand Prix Alanya
 10th Druivenkoers Overijse

Grand Tour general classification results timeline

Track

2011
 2nd  Team pursuit, UEC European Championships
2012
 1st  Omnium, Olympic Games
 UCI World Cup
1st Individual pursuit, Glasgow
1st Team pursuit, Glasgow
 3rd  Omnium, UCI World Championships
2013
 1st Six Days of Copenhagen (with Michael Mørkøv)
 UCI World Championships
2nd  Omnium
3rd  Team pursuit
 UCI World Cup
2nd Points, Manchester
2nd Team pursuit, Aguascalientes
3rd Team pursuit, Manchester
2014
 2nd  Team pursuit, UCI World Championships
 3rd Team pursuit, UCI World Cup, London
2015
 1st Omnium, UCI World Cup, Cambridge
 UEC European Championships
2nd  Omnium
3rd  Team pursuit
2016
 2nd Omnium, UCI World Cup, Hong Kong
 Olympic Games
3rd  Team pursuit
3rd  Omnium
 3rd  Team pursuit, UCI World Championships
2017
 1st Six Days of Copenhagen (with Michael Mørkøv)
 2nd Six Days of Rotterdam (with Michael Mørkøv)
2018
 UCI World Cup
1st Madison (with Michael Mørkøv), Saint-Quentin-en-Yvelines 
1st Team pursuit, Saint-Quentin-en-Yvelines
1st Team pursuit, Milton
1st Madison (with Casper von Folsach), Berlin
2nd Team pursuit, Berlin
2019
 UCI World Cup
1st Madison (with Michael Mørkøv), Minsk
1st Team pursuit, Minsk
1st Team pursuit, Glasgow
 UEC European Championships
1st  Team pursuit
1st  Madison (with Michael Mørkøv)
2nd  Omnium
 UCI World Championships
2nd  Madison (with Casper von Folsach)
3rd  Team pursuit
 2nd Six Days of Rotterdam (with Marc Hester)
2020
 UCI World Championships
1st  Madison (with Michael Mørkøv)
1st  Team pursuit
2021
 Olympic Games
1st  Madison (with Michael Mørkøv)
2nd  Team pursuit
 1st  Madison (with Michael Mørkøv), UCI World Championships
 3rd Six Days of Ghent (with Michael Mørkøv)
2022
 3rd  Team pursuit, UCI World Championships

References

External links

 
 
 
 
 
 
 

1992 births
Living people
Danish male cyclists
Danish track cyclists
Cyclists at the 2012 Summer Olympics
Cyclists at the 2016 Summer Olympics
Cyclists at the 2020 Summer Olympics
Olympic cyclists of Denmark
Olympic gold medalists for Denmark
Olympic silver medalists for Denmark
Olympic bronze medalists for Denmark
Olympic medalists in cycling
People from Faaborg-Midtfyn Municipality
Medalists at the 2012 Summer Olympics
Medalists at the 2016 Summer Olympics
Medalists at the 2020 Summer Olympics
UCI Track Cycling World Champions (men)
Sportspeople from the Region of Southern Denmark
21st-century Danish people